Battle of Raqqa may refer to:

 Battle of Raqqa (2013), between Syrian opposition forces and the Syrian government
 Battle of Raqqa (2017), between Syrian Democratic Forces and the Islamic State